Heaven & Earth is the third commercial studio album by the American Christian and gospel singer Phil Wickham, released on November 17, 2009. The album debuted on No. 4 on Billboards Hot Christian Albums chart after selling nearly 14k albums with more than 40 percent of album sales in digital, making his highest chart debut on Billboard 200 at No. 55.

The acoustic version of Heaven & Earth is an exclusive to the pre-order of the full-length album, contains the unplugged acoustic version of his new record.

The expanded edition of Heaven & Earth is only available for digital download via iTunes on August 31, 2010, the exclusive edition includes four new songs, the new single "In My Love", "Great In My Live", a remix version of "Eden", and "One Who Overcomes" which was also included in the collection album "Catalyst Music Project". On the same day, Phil also released his second live recording "Singalong" album, which includes fourteen his previous hits (incl. "Cannons" and "Divine Romance"), the album is only available for two months on iTunes.

Christian Music Review named the album "One of the Top Albums of 2009".

Background

Theme behind Heaven & Earth

Critical reception

Heaven & Earth has received positive reviews from most music critics.

Nathaniel Schexnayder from Jesus Freak Hideout:  "Throw in Wickham's previous compelling lyrics along with a good sophomore release for INO records (Cannons) and the respected singer/song writer has some momentum built for possibly his best project yet, Heaven & Earth is easily one of the finest worship projects of the year."

Reverend Lee Power from AllMusic: "Heaven & Earth cements Wickham reputation as one of contemporary gospel most original voices, and the perfect tonic for those who feel that modern CCM lacks the artistry of its muse."

Kevin Davis from New Release Tuesday: "Heaven & Earth is not only an encouraging album from a lyrical standpoint, but a delight to listen to with guitar parts that feel like they are literally plucking strings connected to your chest and lonesome yet lush string arrangements, recorded at famed Abbey Road Studios."

“Wickham is moving in a fascinating direction with his sound, and with this album he seems to be testing the waters a bit. It makes the prospect of future material that much more enticing. But until then, we have this fine album—one of 2009’s best—to keep us company.” - ChristianMusicToday.com

"This is definitely Phil Wickham’s best overall album and one of my top 10 albums of 2009.  These melodies are off the charts and any test audience will have a hard time not giving these songs 5 star ratings. This is a 5 star album.” - Christian Music Review

Commercial performance
Heaven & Earth debuted on No. 4 on Billboards Hot Christian Albums chart and No. 55 on Billboard 200 after selling nearly 14,000 copies, with more than 40 percent of album sales in digital, the album also debuted at No. 24 on Billboard Digital Albums.

Track listing
All songs were written and co-written by Phil Wickham, and produced by his long-time producer Peter Kipley. The expanded edition of Heaven & Earth included four new tracks, the new single "In My Love", "Great In My Life", a remix version of "Eden", and "One Who Overcomes" which was originally included in the 2009 compilation album, Catalyst Music Project.

Heaven & Earth

Personnel 

Adapted from album notes.
 Phil Wickham – vocals, guitars, piano
 Evan Wickham – guitars, banjo (4), piano (12)
 Taylor Johnson – guitars (3, 11)
 Pete Kipley – bass
 Brandon Lozano – drums (1-5, 9-12)
 Daniel Bailey – drums (6, 8)
 Joel Plotnik – drums (7)
 The London Symphony Orchestra – strings
 Bart Millard – vocals (6)

Production 
 Pete Kipley – producer, engineer, mixing
 Peter Corbin – recording 
 Steve Churchyard– drum engineer
 Alex Curth – assistant engineer, digital editing 
 David Larring – mixing 
 Chris Athens – mastering
 Christian Rios – photography, art direction
 Noah Gonzales – design, layout

Charts

References

2009 albums
INO Records albums
Phil Wickham albums